The 'B' Assault Brigade RAC/RE. was founded on 5 January 1945, in Italy. The Brigade Headquarters was formed from redesignating the 25th Army Tank Brigade's headquarters to the 25th Armoured Assault Brigade Royal Engineers. Three months later, on 6 April, the formation was redesignated as the 25th Armoured Engineer Brigade Royal Engineers. The brigade served in Italy until the end of the war.

See also

 British Armoured formations of World War II
 List of British brigades of the Second World War

References

Bibliography

25 Armoured Assault Brigade Royal Engineers
Engineer brigades of the British Army
Military units and formations established in 1945